Miroslav Poche (born 3 June 1978) is a Czech politician and economist. He has been a Member of the European Parliament for the Czech Republic from 2014 till 2019. He is a member of the Social Democratic Party.

Early career
From 2009 until 2010, Poche served as adviser in the cabinet of Minister of Foreign Affairs Jan Kohout.

Member of the European Parliament, 2014–2019
Since joining the European Parliament, Poche has been serving on the Committee on Industry, Research and Energy. In addition to his committee assignments, he has been a member of the Parliament's delegations for relations with China and to the Euronest Parliamentary Assembly. He also represented the European Parliament in the OSCE/ODIHR international observation mission for the 2019 Moldovan parliamentary election.

Later career
In Second Cabinet of Andrej Babiš, sworn in in June 2018, Miroslav Poche was originally nominated to be Minister of Foreign Affairs, but President Miloš Zeman's refused to swear him in and Jan Hamáček was made acting foreign minister.

References

Living people
1978 births
MEPs for the Czech Republic 2014–2019
Czech Social Democratic Party MEPs
Charles University alumni
People from Chlumec nad Cidlinou
20th-century Czech economists
21st-century Czech economists
Czech University of Life Sciences Prague alumni